The Joint Institute for Marine Observations (JIMO) is a research institute that is sponsored jointly by National Oceanic and Atmospheric Administration (NOAA)/Office of Oceanic and Atmospheric Research (OAR) and University of California's Scripps Institution of Oceanography. JIMO is located inside the Scripps campus.

The JIMO research themes are:
 Climate and Coastal Observations, Analysis, and Prediction Research
 Biological Systems Research
 Research in Extreme Environments
 Research & Development on Observation Systems

References

External links
 Joint Institute for Marine Observations

Office of Oceanic and Atmospheric Research
Research institutes in the United States
Oceanographic organizations
Scripps Institution of Oceanography
Meteorological research institutes